Sardor Rashidov Ikhtiyorovich (Uzbek Cyrillic: Сардор Рашидов Ихтиёрович; born 14 June 1991) is an Uzbek professional footballer who plays as a winger for QSL side Umm Salal and the Uzbekistan national team.

Club career
Born in Jizzakh, Rashidov began his career with hometown club Sogdiana Jizak before joining FC Bunyodkor in 2009. In his time at the latter club, he won the Uzbek League and Uzbek Cup three times each, as well as winning an Uzbekistan Super Cup and a semi-final finish in the 2012 AFC Champions League.

On 6 July 2015, he moved abroad for the first time to sign a three-year deal with El Jaish SC of the Qatar Stars League. Two years later, following the merger of his club into Al-Duhail SC, he moved on a free transfer to UAE Pro-League side Al Jazira Club, replacing Park Jong-woo as their permitted Asian foreign player.

In his time in Abu Dhabi, Rashidov was not frequently picked by manager Henk ten Cate, and on 4 February 2018 he returned home to Lokomotiv Tashkent. He made his debut eight days later in a home Champions League group match against Al Wahda FC, coming on as a first-half substitute for Nivaldo and scoring in a 5–0 win.

Rashidov left Asia for the first time on 16 January 2019, signing a two-and-a-half-year deal with C.D. Nacional of Portugal's Primeira Liga. He played seven games for the team from Madeira and scored three times, all of which in a 4–0 home win over C.D. Feirense on 16 February. In the following game, against fellow Atlantic islanders C.D. Santa Clara, he did not make the trip after suffering two panic attacks ahead of the flight.

In July 2019, Rashidov rescinded his Nacional contract following their relegation, and signed for Qatar SC.

Kuwait SC
On 17 July 2021, Kuwait SC announced the signing of Rashidov for one season from Pakhtakor Tashkent.

Pakhtakor return
On 31 January 2022, Pakhtakor Tashkent announced the signing of Rashidov to a one-year contract on a free transfer from Kuwait SC.

Umm Salal
On 24 June 2022, Pakhtakor Tashkent announced that Rashidov had signed for Umm Salal.

International career
Rashidov made his debut for the Uzbekistan national football team on 15 October 2013 in a 2015 AFC Asian Cup qualification match at home to Vietnam, and scored the opening goal of a 3–1 win in Tashkent. Coach Mirjalol Qosimov called him up for the final tournament in Australia, where he scored twice in a 3–1 win over Saudi Arabia to advance to the quarter-finals. He was also included for the 2019 edition in the United Arab Emirates.

Career statistics

Club

International
Scores and results list Uzbekistan's goal tally first.

Honours

Bunyodkor
 Uzbek League: 2010, 2011, 2013
 Uzbek Cup: 2010, 2012, 2013
 Uzbekistan Super Cup: 2014

Lokomotiv
 Uzbekistan Super League: 2018

Individual
 Uzbekistan Player of the Year 2nd: 2015

References

External links
 
 
  

1991 births
Living people
Uzbekistani footballers
Uzbekistani expatriate footballers
Uzbekistan international footballers
Association football forwards
2015 AFC Asian Cup players
Expatriate footballers in the United Arab Emirates
Uzbekistani expatriate sportspeople in the United Arab Emirates
Footballers at the 2014 Asian Games
Expatriate footballers in Qatar
Uzbekistani expatriate sportspeople in Qatar
Uzbekistani expatriate sportspeople in Kuwait
Expatriate footballers in Kuwait
Expatriate footballers in Portugal
FC Bunyodkor players
El Jaish SC players
Al Jazira Club players
PFC Lokomotiv Tashkent players
C.D. Nacional players
Kuwait SC players
Qatar SC players
Pakhtakor Tashkent FK players
Umm Salal SC players
Qatar Stars League players
UAE Pro League players
Primeira Liga players
2019 AFC Asian Cup players
Asian Games competitors for Uzbekistan
People from Jizzakh
Uzbekistani expatriate sportspeople in Portugal